Pankaj Singh may refer to:

Pankaj Singh (cricketer) (born 6 May 1985) is an Indian cricketer.
Pankaj Singh (politician) (born 12 December 1978) is an Indian politician who is BJP's General Secretary for Uttar Pradesh.